

National team

Wales failed to reach the 2006 FIFA World Cup.

FAW Premier Cup

Losing semi-final teams each received £25,000. The losing finalists received £50,000 with the winners receiving £100,000. The New Saints won the FAW Premier Cup beating Newport County.

Welsh Cup

The final was played on 6 May 2007 between Afan Lido and Carmarthen Town. Carmarthen Town won 3–2.

Welsh League Cup

Caersws won the Welsh League cup by beating Rhyl in the final. The score at full-time was 1-1 but Caersws won 3–1 on penalties.

Welsh Premier League

Llanelli won their first league title.
Cwmbran Town were relegated to the Welsh Football League Division One

Welsh Football League Division One 

 Champions: Goytre United - did not apply for promotion to Welsh Premier League, Neath Athletic promoted to Welsh Premier League.

Cymru Alliance League 

 Champions: Prestatyn Town - did not apply for promotion to Welsh Premier League, Llangefni Town promoted to Welsh Premier League.

 
Seasons in Welsh football